The Common Reporting Standard (CRS) is an information standard for the Automatic Exchange Of Information (AEOI) regarding financial accounts on a global level, between tax authorities, which the Organisation for Economic Co-operation and Development (OECD) developed in 2014.

Its purpose is to combat tax evasion. The idea was based on the US Foreign Account Tax Compliance Act (FATCA) implementation agreements and its legal basis is the Convention on Mutual Administrative Assistance in Tax Matters. 97 countries had signed an agreement to implement it, with more countries intending to sign later. First reporting occurred in 2017, with many of the rest starting in 2018.

History
Until 2014, the parties to most treaties for sharing asset, income and tax information internationally had shared it upon request, which was not effective in preventing tax evasion.

2014 declaration
In May 2014, forty-seven countries tentatively agreed on a "common reporting standard", formally referred to as the Standard for Automatic Exchange of Financial Account Information: an agreement to share information on their residents' assets and income automatically in conformation with the standard. Endorsing countries included all 34 OECD countries, as well as Argentina, Brazil, China, Colombia, Costa Rica, India, Indonesia, Latvia, Lithuania, Malaysia, Saudi Arabia, Singapore, and South Africa.

In September 2014, the G-20 major economies, at their meeting in Cairns, Australia, issued a G20 Common Reporting Standard implementation plan.

The new system was intended to transfer all relevant information automatically and systematically. The agreement has informally been referred to as GATCA (the global version of FATCA)", but "CRS is not just an extension of FATCA".

Multilateral Competent Authority Agreement, 2014-present 
, 51 countries had signed up to the Multilateral Competent Authority Agreement (MCAA), to automatically exchange information based on Article 6 of the Convention on Mutual Administrative Assistance in Tax Matters The agreement specifies the details of what information will be exchanged and when, as set out in the Standard.

, 53 jurisdictions had signed the agreement to automatically exchange information;  83 jurisdictions had signed the agreement.

All European Union (EU) countries, China, India, Hong Kong, Russia and 109 countries altogether have agreed to become signatories. Yet many countries will not participate in the automatic information exchange. Many of those that have not signed are small countries. In April 2016, shortly after the release of the controversial Panama papers, Panama adopted the Multilateral Competent Authorities Agreement (MCAA) and signed the MCAA in Paris in January 2018 joining the CRS MCAA as the 98th jurisdiction. In the United States, a different cross-border tax compliance approach is promoted through the Foreign Account Tax Compliance Act (FATCA). The U.S. receives information relating to US citizens' accounts from many countries due to the compliance requirements of the FATCA. The United States, in many cases, will reciprocate by sharing banking data with countries for accounts which their citizens hold in the U.S., but not automatically, as is required by the U.S. in FATCA.

Information exchanged
The information and its exchange format are governed by a detailed standard, whose details are listed in a 44-page long document.

Each participating country will annually automatically exchange with the other country the below information in the case of Jurisdiction A with respect to each Jurisdiction B reportable account, and in the case of Jurisdiction B with respect to each Jurisdiction A reportable account:
 Name, address, Taxpayer Identification Number (TIN) and date and place of birth of each Reportable Person. 
 Account number 
 Name and identifying number of the reporting financial institution;
 Account balance or value as of the end of the relevant calendar year (or other appropriate reporting period) or at its closure, if the account was closed.
 Capital gains, depending on the type of the account (dividends, interest, gross proceeds/redemptions, other)

Reportable accounts
OECD allows the participating countries to determine what accounts are reportable. "The term "reportable account" means a [Jurisdiction A] reportable account or a [Jurisdiction B] reportable account, depending on the context, provided it has been identified as such pursuant to due diligence procedures, consistent with the Annex, in place in [Jurisdiction A] or [Jurisdiction B]."

This means that either jurisdiction may negotiate and determine its own reportable accounts in its agreement.

Participants
The European Union adopted the CRS on 1 January 2016 after amending the part on administrative cooperation re taxation. First reporting was planned for September 2017.

As of June 2017, the following countries committed to start reporting in 2017: Anguilla, Argentina, Barbados, Belgium, Bermuda, British Virgin Islands, Bulgaria, Cayman Islands, Colombia, Croatia, Curaçao, Cyprus, Czech Republic, Denmark, Estonia, Faroe Islands, Finland, France, Germany, Gibraltar, Greece, Greenland, Guernsey, Hungary, Iceland, India, Ireland, Isle of Man, Italy, Jersey, Korea, Latvia, Liechtenstein, Lithuania, Luxembourg, Malta, Mexico, Montserrat, Netherlands, Niue, Norway, Poland, Portugal, Romania, San Marino, Seychelles, Slovak Republic, Slovenia, South Africa, Spain, Sweden, Trinidad and Tobago, Turks and Caicos Islands, United Kingdom
Starting to report in 2018: Albania, Andorra, Antigua and Barbuda, Aruba, Australia, Austria, The Bahamas, Bahrain, Belize, Brazil, Brunei Darussalam, Canada, Chile, China, Cook Islands, Costa Rica, Dominica, Ghana, Grenada, Hong Kong (China), Indonesia, Israel, Japan, Kuwait, Lebanon, Marshall Islands, Macao (China), Malaysia, Mauritius, Monaco, Nauru, New Zealand, Pakistan, Panama, Qatar, Russia, Saint Kitts and Nevis, Samoa, Saint Lucia, Saint Vincent and the Grenadines, Saudi Arabia, Singapore, Sint Maarten, Turkey, Switzerland, United Arab Emirates, Uruguay, Vanuatu

Non-CRS countries participating in global transparency for tax purposes 

Of the 154 countries which have signed on the Global Forum on Transparency and Exchange of Information for Tax Purposes, the following countries have not signed on to the CRS:

(Incomplete list as of June 2017) Armenia, Azerbaijan, Botswana, Burkina Faso, Cameroon, Chad, Côte d’Ivoire, Djibouti, Dominican Republic, Ecuador, Egypt, El Salvador, Gabon, Georgia, Guatemala, Guyana, Jamaica, Kenya, Kingdom of Lesotho, Liberia, Maldives, Mauritania, Moldova, Morocco, Niger, Nigeria, Papua New Guinea, Paraguay, Peru, Philippines, North Macedonia, Senegal, Tanzania, Thailand, Togo, Tunisia, Uganda, Ukraine, United States.

Non-participating countries 
(List as of June 2019) 59 countries have not signed the CRS Standard yet: Afghanistan, Algeria, Angola, Bangladesh, Belarus, Benin, Bhutan, Bolivia, Burundi, Central African Republic, Comoros, Congo, Cuba, East Timor, Equatorial Guinea, Eritrea, Eswatini, Ethiopia, Fiji, Georgia, Gambia, Guinea-Bissau, Honduras, Iran, Iraq, Jordan, Kiribati, Kyrgyzstan, Laos, Libya, Malawi, Mali, Mozambique, Myanmar, Namibia, Nepal, Nicaragua, North Korea, Palau, São Tomé and Príncipe, Sierra Leone, Solomon Islands, Somalia, South Sudan, Sri Lanka, Sudan, Suriname, Syria, Taiwan, Tajikistan, Tonga, Turkmenistan, Tuvalu, Uzbekistan, Vatican City State, Venezuela, Vietnam, Yemen, Zambia, Zimbabwe.

Reactions

Private sector
In 2016, a legal expert complained that "The CRS has a much more ambitious scope, however, and modelling the standard on the FATCA rules has created problems for implementing it in Europe". And a "private sector advocacy group representing financial services and law firms" went even further seeing a "showdown" between the two regimes.

Developing countries
Transparency groups have reacted in various ways, some of them criticising how developing countries were (not) considered and involved. Collecting and providing information can be so costly and difficult for developing countries obviating participation in the scheme. Instead of offering a period of non-reciprocity, where developing countries could simply receive financial data, the only mention of non-reciprocity agreements is catering to tax havens.

Loopholes
While tax havens will have to provide some information, they can use a number of loopholes (unequal standards for how information is shared e.g.) and also elect not to receive any info in return. The Financial Transparency Coalition criticised the access cost of $73 to download OECD’s report itself, being "a perfect illustration of why this process needs to include low income countries from the start".

The OECD reviews investment mechanisms worldwide to identify risks in compliance and loopholes. It opened a website for whistle-blowers to anonymously report CRS violations including for pensions, insurance, and citizenship-for-sale tools. The OECD has investigated and labeled specifically as "low-risk" an investment tool in Hong Kong called ORS (Occupational Retirement Scheme) which is classified as a "non-reporting financial institutions" and can be used to bypass CRS as it does not need reporting under CRS guidelines and can be used to effectively be like a shell company.

See also
 Foreign Account Tax Compliance Act (FATCA)
 Qualified intermediary

References

External links
 Automatic Exchange of Information portal OECD
 Standard for Automatic Exchange of Financial Account Information in Tax Matters, Second Edition OECD
 List of signatories with implementation date. OECD
 What Should U.S. Taxable Investors Know About FATCA and CRS? Frederic Behrens
 Full country table with CRFS implementation status OECD
 Full current bilateral exchange agreements within CRS OECD

Standards
OECD
International taxation
OECD treaties